A buttonhook is a tool used to facilitate the closing of buttoned shoes, gloves or other clothing. It consists of a hook fixed to a handle which may be simple or decorative as part of a dresser set or chatelaine. Sometimes they were given away as promotions with product advertising on the handle. To use, the hook end is inserted through the buttonhole to capture the button by the shank and draw it through the opening.

Buttonhooks have other uses as well. At Ellis Island, screeners known as "buttonhook men" used buttonhooks to turn immigrants' eyelids inside out to look for signs of trachoma.

Buttonhooks on display at Bedford Museum & Art Gallery

References

External links
Silverdale Buttonhooks
2013 Exhibition of Buttonhooks, Buxton Museum & Art Gallery, Buxton, Derbyshire, U.K.

Textile closures